Mocis proverai is a moth of the family Erebidae first described by Alberto Zilli in 2000. It is found in Africa and the Arabian Peninsula.

In a recent publication Mocis frugalis, that is found in Asia and Australia was promoted to a separate species. Both species can be distinguished with microscopic examination of the genitalia.

The larvae feed on various grasses like sugarcane and oat.

References

Moths of Africa
Moths of the Middle East
Moths described in 2000
proverai